Chuck Sims (born February 19, 1958) is an American politician of the Republican Party who served in the Georgia House of Representatives from 1997 to 2015.

After being arrested multiple times for reckless driving and driving under the influence, he didn't run for reelection in 2014.

References

1958 births
Living people
Members of the Georgia House of Representatives
Georgia (U.S. state) Democrats
Georgia (U.S. state) Republicans